Brenham is a pallasite meteorite found near Haviland, a small town in Kiowa County, Kansas, United States.  Pallasites are a type of stony–iron meteorite that when cut and polished show yellowish olivine (peridot) crystals.

The Brenham meteorite is associated with the Haviland Crater.

History

Classification and composition
Brenham is an anomalous pallasite (Pallasite-an).

Specimens
The  mass found by Mani and Arnold is currently housed in a private collection in Texas.

The  mass discovered in 1949 is called The Space Wanderer and is on display at The Big Well in Greensburg, Kansas. It was found, and excavated using hand tools, on the Ellis Peck farm, east of Greensburg, Kansas.

A large collection of Brenham meteorites, along with numerous fragments weighing a total of 8,500 pounds, were once housed at the now-closed Kansas Meteorite Museum and Nature Center in Haviland, Kansas.

See also
Glossary of meteoritics

References

External links

The largest recovered Brenham oriented fragment on World Record Meteorite Website
 

Meteorites found in the United States
Geology of Kansas
Stony-iron meteorites